The Dominican Republic–Haiti border is an international border between the Dominican Republic and the Republic of Haiti on the island of Hispaniola. Extending from the Caribbean Sea in the south to the Atlantic Ocean in the north, the 391 km border was agreed upon in the 1929 Dominican-Haitian border treaty.

The island was first formally divided in 1697 as part of the Peace of Ryswick, under which Spain ceded to France the western portion it had seized by force earlier in the century. In 1621, England made an unsuccessful attempt to take over both sides of the island. In the early 20th century, the United States occupied both countries, and made numerous changes to the border. The Dominican Republic comprises approximately the eastern two-thirds of the island and the Republic of Haiti the western third.

Description

The border starts in the north at the Boca del Río Dajabón where the Dajabón River (Rivière du Massacre) enters Manzanillo Bay, immediately west of the Dominican town of Pepillo Salcedo. The border then follows this river for a brief period southwards, before continuing southwards via a series of straight lines through the Laguna de Saladillo, rejoining the same river between Dajabón (DR) and Ouanaminthe (Haiti). The border then again follows the river southwards, where it is alternatively called the Río Capatillo/Bernar (Rivière de Capotille/Bernard), down to the Dominican village of Vara de Vaca. The border then proceeds overland to the west, turning sharply south-eastwards upon reaching the Libón River. It continues along the river down to the DR-45 road and then follows this road southwards for some distance through the mountains down to the Artibonite River. The border then follows the Artibonite to the south-west down to the confluence with the Macasía River, following this river eastwards. The border then proceeds overland south-eastwards and south via various straight-line segments, also briefly utilising the Rivière Carrizal. It then turns west in the vicinity of Granada, and then turns south-east to run parallel with the Etang Saumâtre lake, briefly cutting through it at one point. The border curves around the south-east corner of the lake before proceeding overland via straight lines to the south-east and then south-west, then utilising the Río Bonito southwards for a period, before eventually reaching the Pedernales river. It then follows this river southwards out to the Caribbean Sea.

History

The division of the island of Hispaniola dates to the 16th and 17th centuries, when the Spanish colonised the eastern part of the island and the French colonised the western part of the island. After decades of hostilities, mutual acknowledgement by France and Spain of their respective colonies, Saint-Domingue and Santo Domingo, was accomplished by way of the Peace of Ryswick in 1697. A more precise boundary was drawn in 1777 via the Treaty of Aranjuez. The distinction between the two parts of the island was accentuated by differing settlement patterns in the two colonies. Whereas the Spanish developed a settler-based society with limited slavery, the French forcibly settled thousands of African slaves in Saint Domingue, with the slave population coming to dominate demographically. In 1791 the Haitian slaves launched the Haitian Revolution, gaining independence from France in 1804 as the First Empire of Haiti. In 1821 the Dominicans declared independence from Spain; however Haiti then invaded and annexed the colony. The Dominicans fought a war against the Haitians and gained independence on 1844, with the border being restored.

The poor relations between the two states were hampered by disputes over sections of the border, which was not finally delimited until 1929. A subsequent commission set about conducting on-the-ground demarcation, however there were continuing disputes over certain sections of the boundary. These were allocated via a treaty signed on 27 February 1935, with a final border treaty being signed on 9 March 1936. Despite this, Dominican dictator Rafael Trujillo subsequently launched a wave of anti-Haitian violence in 1937, culminating in the Parsley massacre in which thousands of Haitians living in the DR were forced across the border or killed. Though relations since then have improved, the two countries remain deeply divided on demographic, political, racial, cultural and economic lines. Haiti's political situation is volatile, and the economy of the Dominican Republic is ten times larger than that of Haiti, prompting many Haitians to move to the DR seeking better opportunities, where they are often the subject of discrimination.

Border Wall

There has been proposals by several Dominican politicians including Ramfis Trujillo, grandson of Dominican dictator Rafael Trujillo, among others including current president Luis Abinader, to build a wall along the length of the border in an effort to reduce mass immigration from Haiti into the Dominican Republic. The idea is supported by the majority of the Dominican population. The Dominican government has already started building up pieces of stone wall along small sections of the border. Aside from a border wall, the Dominican government has amped up border patrol, while the Haitian government also has shown interest in increasing a border watch presence in certain areas to regulate economic activity between the two countries.

Settlements near the border

Dominican Republic

 Pepillo Salcedo
 Dajabón
 Pedro Santana
 Bánica
 Comendador
 Jimaní
 Pedernales

Haiti 

 Nan Contrée
 Capotille
 Ouanaminthe
 Parc Dubois
 Malpasse
 Belladère
 Fonds-Verrettes
 Banane
 Anse-à-Pitres

Border crossings
There are four official crossings points and many more unofficial ones. The four official crossing points are: Malpasse-Jimaní, Ouanaminthe-Dajabón, Anse-à-Pitres-Pedernales and Belladère-Comendador.

Gallery

See also
 Dominican Republic–Haiti relations
 Emperor Jacques I of Haiti
 Juan Pablo Duarte

References 

 
Dominican Republic–Haiti relations
International borders